The Flakpanzer IV "Ostwind" (East Wind in English) was a German self-propelled anti-aircraft gun based on the Panzer IV tank. It was developed in 1944 as a successor to the earlier Flakpanzer IV/2 cm Vierling Wirbelwind.

The Panzer IV's turret was removed and replaced with an open-top, hexagonal turret that housed a 3.7 cm FlaK 43. In addition to its intended role as an anti-aircraft weapon, the fast-firing gun was highly effective against light vehicles and minor fortifications. A closed-top design would have been preferable, but this was not possible due to the heavy smoke generated by the gun.

The Ostwind's main improvement over the Wirbelwind was the FlaK 43's increased range and stopping power over the 2 cm Flakvierling 38 and slightly better armor on its turret, albeit it had a lower fire rate. To solve this problem a project was undertaken to arm the Ostwind with two 37 mm cannons, known as the Ostwind II. A single prototype was built but the war ended before anything truly became of it.

Although an order for 100 vehicles was placed in August 1944, only 44 vehicles were completed (37 converted from existing Panzer IVs and 7 new production vehicles) from December 1944 to March 1945, all work being carried out by Ostbau Werke in Sagan, Silesia.

Comparable vehicles
 Möbelwagen
 40M Nimród
 M19 Multiple Gun Motor Carriage
 Crusader Mk. III Anti-Aircraft Tank Mk. I
 ZSU-37
 40 mm cannon armed AMX-13

External links
 Panzerworld Ostwind specifications
 Achtung Panzer article on Flakpanzer IV 

World War II self-propelled anti-aircraft weapons of Germany

de:Flakpanzer IV#Ostwind
Military vehicles introduced from 1940 to 1944